The Holy Trinity Church, also known as the Church of the Holy Trinity (Episcopal) is a church located at 325 Gold Street in Juneau, Alaska.  The present building was built in 2009, replacing an 1896 structure which burned on March 12, 2006.

The old church was designed by architect George E. James in the Carpenter Gothic style, and was built by Foss and Olsen in 1896 to serve a mission congregation founded only the year before. Sometime before 1914 the church building was raised up to allow the addition of a basement. The parish hall built in 1956 did not continue the Carpenter Gothic architecture of the church itself. From 1918-1944, the church served as the pro-cathedral of the Episcopal Diocese of Alaska. On October 19, 1978, the church was added to the National Register of Historic Places.

See also
National Register of Historic Places listings in Juneau, Alaska

References

External links
 Church of the Holy Trinity homepage

Buildings and structures in Juneau, Alaska
Carpenter Gothic architecture in Alaska
Carpenter Gothic church buildings in the United States
Gothic Revival church buildings in Alaska
Episcopal church buildings in Alaska
Churches on the National Register of Historic Places in Alaska
Religious organizations established in 1895
Buildings and structures on the National Register of Historic Places in Juneau, Alaska
Church fires in the United States
1895 establishments in Alaska